Larry King Now was a talk show hosted by Larry King, available on Ora TV, Hulu and RT America. Launched on July 17, 2012, the series featured interviews with newsmakers, celebrities, world leaders, and Internet stars. The show was similar to his previous CNN program, Larry King Live.

Broadcasting
The show was the first venture by Ora TV, an on-demand TV network founded in March 2012 by King, his wife Shawn Southwick King, and Carlos Slim. In May 2013, RT America announced that Larry King Now would be broadcast on their network as well, along with the Ora TV show Politicking with Larry King.

References

External links
 

English-language television shows
Web talk shows
American non-fiction web series
2012 American television series debuts
2020 American television series endings
2010s American television talk shows
2020s American television talk shows
RT (TV network) original programming